The LRT Shah Alam Line or LRT 3, previously known as the LRT Bandar Utama–Klang Line, LRT Bandar Utama-Johan Setia Line or simply LRT Johan Setia Line, is a medium-capacity light rapid transit (LRT) line which will be serving the Shah Alam and Klang regions on the western side of the Klang Valley, Malaysia. It will be the third LRT line, and the fourth fully automated and driverless rail system in the Klang Valley region. The line will be operated as part of the RapidKL system by Rapid Rail, a subsidiary of Prasarana Malaysia. It was announced by Prasarana Malaysia on 24 April 2013.

Once completed, the line will form part of the Klang Valley Integrated Transit System. It is numbered  and coloured sky blue on official transit maps.

The line is one out of four rapid transit lines in the Klang Valley that does not serve KL Sentral, the other three being the Ampang Line, Sri Petaling Line and the Putrajaya Line, as well as the first rapid transit line in the Klang Valley that is entirely outside the borders of the Federal Territory of Kuala Lumpur.

Stations
{
  "type": "ExternalData",
  "service": "geoline",
  "ids": "Q17055821",
  "properties": {
    "stroke": "#00aae4",
    "stroke-width": 6
  }
}

Previously, a total of 26 stations were planned, with a proposed two-kilometre distance between each station. One station was to be an underground station, with the other 25 being elevated.

The LRT3 will feature a few interchange stations. The planned interchanges are  Bandar Utama on the MRT Kajang Line and  CGC-Glenmarie on the LRT Kelana Jaya Line.

The alignment is based on the Final Railway Scheme approved by the Land Public Transport Commission (SPAD).

Due to the change of government in the 2018 Malaysian general election, the new Pakatan Harapan government decided to cut costs around the project and shelved six stations from the initial plan. The Lien Hoe, Temasya, SIRIM, Bukit Raja and Bandar Botanik stations were converted into provisional stations while the underground station of Persiaran Hishamuddin was cancelled. The reasons cited for the changes made were due to the high cost of the project, unnecessary tunneling for the underground portion of the line and low ridership in the area. The provisional stations however will be built once the demand in the area picks up.

Other cost-cutting exercises including the swapping of six-car trains for three-car trains, cutting down the total trains from 42 to 22, reducing the size of the stations and ditching costly acceleration techniques. The completion date also was extended from 2020 to 2024.

Alignment and station list 
The line currently has 25 permanent stations under construction, five of them being kept as provisional stations for the future.

Chronology
30 May 2014 – The Shah Alam LRT would begin from Bandar Utama, Kelana Jaya, through areas of Glenmarie, HICOM-Glenmarie Industrial Park, Shah Alam Stadium, Shah Alam city centre, UiTM, I-City, Bukit Raja Shopping Centre, Taman Eng Ann, Bandar Klang and then heading straight on to Johan Setia.
17 July 2014 – Following 2015 Budget which is tabled on 10 October 2014, the Prime Minister announced that the government will fund RM9 billion to build the LRT3 project linking Bandar Utama to Shah Alam and Klang, which is already in Prasarana's drawing board.
23 July 2014 – There are several disputes on the proposed routes with the main concern is on the line's integration with the Sungai Buloh-Kajang MRT line.
11 August 2014 – Construction of LRT3 may damage structures, says chairman of chamber.
11 October 2014 – The project was approved with an allocation of RM9 billion. This line is no longer be an extension of the LRT Kelana Jaya Line as initially proposed.
13 December 2014 – Prasarana to roll out LRT3 projects by second half of 2015
11 April 2015 – Tender documents for RM9bil LRT3 project ready for collection LRT3 will be integrated with Kelana Jaya Line in Glenmarie LRT Station, which is currently being built as a part of the Kelana Jaya Line extension project. LRT3 is expected to be used by 300,000 users. The public display of the line will be held for three months beginning in May.
 12 May 2015 – LRT3 works to start by Q1-2016. LRT3 public display to start on 15 May 2015. It will be put up for three months at seven locations – Shah Alam City Council, Petaling Jaya City Council, Public Land Transportation Commission office in Platinum Sentral, Klang Municipal Council and the Kelana Jaya, Masjid Jamek and Pasar Seni LRT stations – from 9am to 5pm on weekdays.
15 May 2015 – Day One of Public Inspection of LRT3 Railway Scheme.
4 September 2015 – Prasarana Malaysia Berhad announced that Malaysian Resources Corporation Berhad (MRCB) and George Kent Sdn Bhd joint venture (JV) has been appointed as the Project Delivery Partner (PDP) for the Bandar Utama–Klang (LRT3) project.
20 October 2015 – Prasarana has agreed to change the LRT3 route, which was originally planned to cut through the housing area of Taman Muhibah in Klang to Pasar Besar Klang (Klang wet market) at Jalan Meru. Residents of Taman Muhibah had been objecting the proposed line which would run through their housing area.
24 August 2016 – Official launch of the LRT3 project by the former Malaysian Prime Minister Najib Razak.
25 July 2018 - Cost-cutting exercises officially approved by Pakatan Harapan government. Five stations converted into provisional stations. One station cancelled. Six-car trains swapped for three-car trains, total trains cut down from 42 to 22, stations size reduced, acceleration techniques ditched and completion date extended from 2020 to 2024.
15 June 2020 – Day One of Public Inspection of LRT3 Revised Railway Scheme, on display until 15 September 2020.
1 July 2021 – As of Q2 2021, LRT3 overall linewide progress achieve 57.57%.
16 August 2022 – As of Q2 2022, LRT3 overall linewide progress achieve 74.04%.

Other Information
 Initially, the Klang LRT station was planned as an interchange station with the Klang KTM station. However, due to efforts to reduce cost and objections from Little India Klang business residents, the station will be built beside Emporium Makan and Shaw Centrepoint Mall which is 700 meters away from the KTM Komuter station, resulting in a same-name but different stations situation, similar to Salak Selatan LRT/KTM and Sentul LRT/KTM stations. 
 The line will be connected with 3 retail malls and shopping centres, namely the Shaw Center Point (The Store), Lotus's Klang (formerly TESCO Bukit Tinggi) and AEON Bukit Tinggi in Klang.
 The trains will have a maximum operating speed of 80 km/h (17% faster than the current Kelana Jaya Line) with the capacity of carrying 36,720 passengers per hour per direction.

Gallery

References

External links
 Official LRT3 website
 MRT and LRT3 Line Integrations
 Rapid KL, LRT3 service brands

 
Proposed rail infrastructure in Malaysia
Transport in the Klang Valley
Passenger rail transport in Malaysia
2024 in rail transport